The Blues and The Abstract Truth, Take 2 is a 2008 album, released on the Resonance label, by American jazz pianist Bill Cunliffe. It is a tribute to Oliver Nelson, particularly to his 1961 album The Blues and the Abstract Truth.

Track listing

 "Stolen Moments" 
 "Hoe Down" 
 "Cascades" 
 "Yearnin'" 
 "Butch and Butch" 
 "Teenie's Blues" 
 "Port Authority" 
 "Mary Lou's Blues"

(1-6: Oliver Nelson; 7&8: Bill Cunliffe)

Performers
 Bill Cunliffe - piano and arranger
 Terell Stafford - guest soloist: trumpet
 Jeff Clayton - guest soloist: alto sax
 Andy Martin - trombone
 Bob Sheppard - tenor sax and soprano sax
 Brian Scanlon - alto sax
 Larry Lunetta - trumpet
 Tom Warrington - bass
 Mark Ferber - drums

External links
The Blues and the Abstract Truth, Take 2 — Resonance Records
 — at youtube.com (c/o Resonance Records, with Paul Kreibich (drums), Ricky Woodward (tenor sax) and Bob Summers (trumpet))

2008 albums
Jazz albums by American artists